Téhini is a town in northeastern Ivory Coast. It is a sub-prefecture of and the seat of Téhini Department in Bounkani Region, Zanzan District. Téhini is also a commune.

In 2014, the population of the sub-prefecture of Téhini was 15,122.

Villages
The xx villages of the sub-prefecture of Téhini and their population in 2014 are:

Notes

Sub-prefectures of Bounkani
Communes of Bounkani